Myriam Yasmine Benlazar (born 9 June 1995) is a French-born Algerian footballer who plays for Toulouse and the Algeria national team.

She played for Algeria at the 2014 African Women's Championship and the 2018 Africa Women Cup of Nations.

She had previously represented the France national under-16 team.

References

External links
 
 

1995 births
Living people
Algerian women's footballers
Algeria women's international footballers
French women's footballers
Women's association football midfielders
Toulouse FC (women) players
ASPTT Albi players
Division 1 Féminine players
French sportspeople of Algerian descent
France women's youth international footballers